The 2020 NBA All-Star Game was an exhibition basketball game that was played on February 16, 2020, during the National Basketball Association's (NBA) 2019–20 season. It was the 69th edition of the NBA All-Star Game, and was played at the United Center in Chicago, home of the Chicago Bulls. Team LeBron defeated Team Giannis, 157–155. This was the third time that Chicago hosted the All-Star Game. The other two times, in 1973 and 1988, the game was played at Chicago Stadium, the Bulls' previous home arena. The game was televised nationally by TNT for the 18th consecutive year, and simulcast by TBS for the 6th consecutive year. After airing a “Players Only” broadcast a year ago, TBS returned to simulcasting TNT’s coverage, after the “Players Only” brand was canceled by the NBA and Turner Sports.

All-Star Game

Coaches

The two coaches came from the two teams leading their respective conferences as of February 2, 2020, with certain restrictions. Frank Vogel, coach of the Western Conference-leading Los Angeles Lakers, qualified as the head coach for Team LeBron on January 23. Nick Nurse, coach of the Toronto Raptors, qualified as the head coach for Team Giannis on January 31. Although the Milwaukee Bucks clinched the best record in the Eastern Conference, their coach, Mike Budenholzer, was ineligible to coach in the All-Star Game as league rules prohibited a coach from coaching in consecutive All-Star Games (he had coached in the 2019 game).

Rosters
As had been the case in previous years, the rosters for the All-Star Game were selected through a voting process. The fans could vote through the NBA website as well as through their Google account. The starters were chosen by the fans, media, and current NBA players. Fans made up 50% of the vote, and NBA players and media each comprised 25% of the vote. The two guards and three frontcourt players who received the highest cumulative vote totals in each conferences were named the All-Star starters and two players in each conferences with the highest votes were named team captains. NBA head coaches voted for the reserves for their respective conferences, none of which could be players from their own team. Each coach selected two guards, three frontcourt players and two wild cards, with each selected player ranked in order of preference within each category. If a multi-position player was to be selected, coaches were encouraged to vote for the player at the position that was "most advantageous for the All-Star team", regardless of where the player was listed on the All-Star ballot or the position he was listed in box scores.

The All-Star Game starters were announced on January 23, 2020. Trae Young of the Atlanta Hawks and Kemba Walker of the Boston Celtics were named the backcourt starters in the East, earning their first and fourth all-star appearances, respectively. Pascal Siakam of the Toronto Raptors and Giannis Antetokounmpo of the Milwaukee Bucks were named the frontcourt starters in the East, earning their first and fourth all-star appearances, respectively. Joining in the East frontcourt was Joel Embiid of the Philadelphia 76ers, his third selection.

Luka Dončić of the Dallas Mavericks and James Harden of the Houston Rockets were named to the starting backcourt in the West, earning their first and eighth all-star appearances, respectively. In the frontcourt, Kawhi Leonard of the Los Angeles Clippers was named to his fourth career all-star game, along with Anthony Davis and LeBron James of the Los Angeles Lakers, their seventh and 16th all-star selections, respectively.

The All-Star Game reserves were announced on January 30, 2020. The West reserves included Russell Westbrook of the Houston Rockets, his ninth selection, Rudy Gobert of the Utah Jazz, his first selection, Brandon Ingram of the New Orleans Pelicans, his first selection, Damian Lillard of the Portland Trail Blazers, his fifth selection, Chris Paul of the Oklahoma City Thunder, his tenth selection, Nikola Jokić of the Denver Nuggets, his second selection, and Donovan Mitchell of the Utah Jazz, his first selection.

The East reserves included Kyle Lowry of the Toronto Raptors, his sixth selection, Khris Middleton of the Milwaukee Bucks, his second selection, Jimmy Butler of the Miami Heat, his fifth selection, Domantas Sabonis of the Indiana Pacers, his first selection, Ben Simmons of the Philadelphia 76ers, his second selection, Jayson Tatum of the Boston Celtics, his first selection, and Bam Adebayo of the Miami Heat, his first selection.

Italics indicates leading vote-getters per conference

 Damian Lillard was unable to play due to a groin injury.
 Devin Booker was selected as Damian Lillard's replacement.

Draft
The draft took place on February 6, 2020, on TNT. LeBron James and Giannis Antetokounmpo were both named captains for the second year in a row, as they both received the most votes from the West and East, respectively. This was the third straight year that James was named an All-Star team captain, while this was Giannis’ second consecutive selection as team captain. The first eight players drafted were starters. The next fourteen players (seven from each conference) were chosen by NBA head coaches. NBA Commissioner Adam Silver selected the replacement for any player unable to participate in the All-Star Game, choosing a player from the same conference as the player who was being replaced. Silver's selection would join the team that drafted the replaced player. If a replaced player was a starter, the head coach of that team would choose a new starter from his cast of players instead.

James picked Anthony Davis with his first pick, and Antetokounmpo picked Joel Embiid second. Team Giannis was the home team due to the Eastern Conference having home team status for the game.

Lineups

Game
It was announced on January 30, 2020, that the game would use a new format. The first three quarters were individually scored as separate games, with the scoreboard resetting after each quarter. The team that won each quarter got $100,000 for their team's charity; if tied, the total was added to the pot for the next quarter. At the end of the third quarter, the cumulative score was posted on the scoreboard, and the entire period was played under The Basketball Tournament's Elam Ending, a rule recommended by players' union president Chris Paul, who coached in the aforementioned tournament in 2019, for the entire quarter. The NBA All-Star Game's Elam Ending used a target score of 24 points more than the leading team's or both teams' score in honor of Kobe Bryant, who died on January 26, 2020. The winning team won $200,000 for their charity. If one team had won each of the first three quarters and reached the target score first, $500,000 would have been donated to the winning team's charity and $100,000 would have been donated to the losing team's charity.

To further honor Kobe Bryant and his daughter Gianna, who died with him in the Calabasas helicopter crash, players on Team LeBron wore #2 (Gianna's basketball number), while players on Team Giannis wore #24 (Bryant's number from 2006 to 2016).

Team LeBron won the 1st quarter, and Team Giannis won the 2nd quarter, and the 3rd quarter was tied, so the $100,000 was carried over to the 4th quarter, for a total of $300,000 on the line in the final quarter. Since Team Giannis led the cumulative score 133–124, in accordance with the rules of the Elam Ending, the teams played to a target score of 157 but without a game clock for the 4th quarter.

Anthony Davis walked-off the final point for Team LeBron on the second of two free throws to win the game, 157–155, in a back-and-forth 4th quarter which featured multiple defensive plays. The Elam Ending format was received well by fans and players alike.

Kawhi Leonard of Team LeBron was awarded the NBA All-Star Game Kobe Bryant Most Valuable Player award.

All-Star Weekend

NBA on TNT American Express Road Show

Celebrity Game

Rising Stars Challenge

Skills Challenge

 Derrick Rose was unable to participate due to an adductor strain.
 Shai Gilgeous-Alexander was selected as Derrick Rose's replacement.

Three Point Contest

Slam Dunk Contest

References

External links
 2020 NBA All-Star Game at nba.com

National Basketball Association All-Star Game
Basketball competitions in Chicago
All-Star
NBA-All Star Game
NBA-All Star Game